Silverback Gorilla is the third studio album by American rapper Sheek Louch. The album was released on March 18, 2008, by Koch Records and D-Block Records. The album's first single is "Good Love", produced by Red Spyda and featuring samples of Betty Wright's "Tonight Is The Night" and "Pure Love" songs. The album features guest appearances from Jadakiss, Styles P, Bun B, DJ Unk, Jim Jones, The Game, Fat Joe, Hell Rell and Bully. The album debuted at number 41 on the Billboard 200 chart, selling 17,818 copies in its first week.

Track listing

Charts

References

2008 albums
E1 Music albums
Albums produced by Dame Grease
Sheek Louch albums
D-Block Records albums